Reginald Charles Allen (2 July 1858 in Glebe, New South Wales – 2 May 1952 in Sydney) was an Australian cricketer who played in one Test match against England in 1887.

Allen played for New South Wales and was top scorer in the first innings of the state match against the England team – under the name "A. Shaw's XI" – that immediately preceded the second Test.

He batted at number three in his only Test, scored 14 and 30, and took two catches. In his second innings, he was caught by one of his own side, Charlie Turner, who was fielding as a substitute for England. His obituary in Wisden in 1953 says that he turned down the opportunity to tour England in 1888 under the captaincy of Percy McDonnell.

Allen, who attended Sydney Grammar School, was a successful scholar. He attained the highest mark in the New South Wales Public Examinations in his final year at school, and was later awarded the University Medal at the University of Sydney. Although he was not athletic in build, he was also a successful all-round sportsman, representing Sydney University's First Grade Rugby Union team, and playing in the New South Wales Open Tennis Championship (which was then entirely amateur). He became an enthusiastic and moderately successful breeder and owner of racehorses.

His father was George Wigram Allen, a lawyer and politician.  After graduating from university, Allen joined his father's law firm (now known as Allens), of which he remained a partner for several decades. He was the uncle of the England Test captain Gubby Allen, who was born in Australia. Reginald Allen married Edith Muriel Grubb in Franklin, Tasmania, in April 1906. He died in 1952 and his funeral proceeded from St Stephen's Church in Macquarie Street to the Northern Suburbs Crematorium.

References

External links

1858 births
1952 deaths
People educated at Sydney Grammar School
Sydney Law School alumni
Australia Test cricketers
New South Wales cricketers
Australian cricketers
Cricketers from Sydney
19th-century Australian lawyers
20th-century Australian lawyers